Timothy Andrew Murray (born 12 February 1955) is an Australian archaeologist. He joined the Archaeology department of La Trobe University in 1986 as a lecturer.  On the retirement of the foundation Chair Professor Jim Allen, Murray was appointed to the Chair of Archaeology in 1995. He has also taught at the University of New South Wales, the University of Sydney, Cambridge University, the University of Leiden (The Netherlands), the Université de Paris I (Panthéon-Sorbonne), the Ecole des hautes etudes en sciences sociales (Paris) and the Institute of Archaeology, University College London. He was elected a Fellow of the Society of Antiquaries of London in 2003 and Fellow of the Academy of the Humanities in Australia in the same year.

Research projects 

His research interests include the history, philosophy and sociology of archaeology, theoretical archaeology (particularly issues of temporality), contact archaeology, the archaeology of the modern world, and heritage issues. He is an editor in chief of the Bulletin of the History of Archaeology.

In Melbourne, he has played prominent roles in developing large scale historical archaeological excavations in urban contexts including the Casselden Place dig, and recent excavations at the Royal Exhibition Building.

 Sir John Lubbock and the foundation of prehistoric archaeology
 Building Transnational Archaeologies in the Modern World 1750-1950
 Urban Archaeology in Melbourne
 Exploring the Archaeology of the Modern City
 An Archaeology of Australia
 A Global History of Archaeology

References

Bibliography
Encyclopedia of archaeology, edited by Tim Murray, Santa Barbara, Calif.: ABC-CLIO, c1999-2001 
Archaeology from Australia, edited by Tim Murray, Melbourne, Vic. : Australian Scholarly Publishing, 2004.

External links
Tim Murray's staff page at La Trobe University

1955 births
Living people
Australian archaeologists
Fellows of the Society of Antiquaries of London